Marvin Miller (1917–2012) was an American labor economist and head of Major League Baseball Players Association.

Marvin Miller may also refer to:

Marvin Miller (actor) (1913–1985), American voice-over character actor
Marvin E. Miller Sr. (1927–1999), American journalist, editor and state legislator
Marvin E. Miller Jr. (1945–2016), American state legislator, son of above
Marvin Miller, the main character in the U.S. comic strip Marvin

See also
Miller (name)